Modesto Denis (9  March 1901 - 30 April 1956) was a Paraguayan football goalkeeper who played for Paraguay in the 1930 FIFA World Cup. He also played for Club Nacional.

References

External links
FIFA profile

1901 births
Paraguayan footballers
Paraguay international footballers
Association football goalkeepers
Club Nacional footballers
1930 FIFA World Cup players
1956 deaths